Jäkärlä is a district in the Maaria-Paattinen ward of the city of Turku, in Finland. It is located to the north of the city, and is a very sparsely populated area.

The current population of Jäkärlä is 3,460, and it is decreasing at an annual rate of 0.43%. 19.31% of the district's population are under 15 years old, while 8.32% are over 65. The district's linguistic makeup is 93.18% Finnish, 1.45% Swedish, and 5.38% other.

See also 
 Districts of Turku
 Districts of Turku by population

Districts of Turku